The De Aar Wind Energy Facility is a wind farm in the Emthanjeni Local Municipality , built on the Maanhaarberg near De Aar in the Northern Cape province of South Africa. The facility became operational in November 2017.

References

Wind farms in South Africa
Economy of the Northern Cape
Pixley ka Seme District Municipality